Ballads of the Day is an original jazz compilation by Nat King Cole. It released in 1956. The album reached a peak position of number 16 on the Billboard 200.

Track listing 
"A Blossom Fell" (Howard Barnes, Harold Cornelius, Dominic John) - 2:33
"Unbelievable" (Jerry Livingston, Irving Gordon) - 3:04
"Blue Gardenia" (Bob Russell, Lester Lee) - 2:58
"Angel Eyes" (Matt Dennis, Earl Brent) - 3:15
"It Happens to Be Me" (Sammy Gallop, Arthur Kent) - 3:09
"Smile" (John Turner, Geoffrey Parsons, Charlie Chaplin) - 2:54
"Darling, Je Vous Aime Beaucoup" (Anna Sosanko) - 2:51
"Alone Too Long" (Arthur Schwartz, Dorothy Fields) - 2:56
"My One Sin (In Life)" (Mascherino, Robert Mellin) - 2:59
"Return to Paradise" (Dimitri Tiomkin, Ned Washington) - 2:57
"If Love Is Good to Me" (Fred Spielman, Redd Evans) - 2:47
"The Sand and the Sea" (Hal Hester, B. Parker) - 2:33

Personnel 
 Nat King Cole - Vocals, piano
 Nelson Riddle - arranger
 Billy May - arranger on track 4 only
 Lee Gillette - Producer

References

1956 albums
Albums arranged by Billy May
Albums arranged by Nelson Riddle
Capitol Records albums
EMI Records albums
Nat King Cole albums